The Taylor–Van Note House, also known as Blairs Ferry Wayside Inn/Vanesther Place, is a historic building located in Cedar Rapids, Iowa, United States. Charles Taylor had this two-story, wood frame, vernacular Greek Revival house built in 1846. The family owned the house until 1888 when it was sold to Lazarus Van Note, whose family owned it as late as 1985. Oral legend has it that Taylor rented the front rooms to travelers as they passed through the region.  It was located close to James Blair's ferry across the Cedar River, which is why it has long been known as the Blairs Ferry Wayside Inn.  The house was built of heavy timbers and exemplifies a traditional I-house.  It features two rooms on both floors across its length, and one room deep.  The main door is flanked by sidelights and a transom across the top.  The house was listed on the National Register of Historic Places in 1985.

References

Houses completed in 1846
Greek Revival architecture in Iowa
Houses in Cedar Rapids, Iowa
National Register of Historic Places in Cedar Rapids, Iowa
Houses on the National Register of Historic Places in Iowa
I-houses in Iowa